Manyava Skete of the Exaltation of the Holy Cross, (transliterated often as Maniava or Manjava Skete) - otherwise known as Ukrainian Athos, is Orthodox solitary cell men's monastery (skete) in the Carpathian mountains of western Ukraine. It is situated on the outskirts of the village of Maniava in Ivano-Frankivsk Raion of Ivano-Frankivsk Oblast and belongs to the Ukrainian Orthodox Church of Kyiv Patriarchate. Hegumen of the monastery is Ioasaf, metropolitan of Ivano-Frankivsk and Halych. Currently there are 8 monks residing at the monastery.

Manyava Skete is famous for the apparition of Virgin Mary who appeared here twice and for its miracle-working icon of Manyava Icon of Mother of God. The icon "cried" twice, shedding myrrh (supernatural oil) in 2004 and last in spring of 2012. These events were widely reported by the Ukrainian news and TV media. Thousands of Orthodox pilgrims arrive here during the year.

History

It played an imported role as Orthodox spiritual center during the 17th and 18th centuries. In 1628 at the Kyiv church synod Manyava Skete was granted the status of "prot", the principal heading monastery over the monasteries in the Ruthenian, Belz and Podolian Voivodeships. Over 500 monasteries in Ukraine, Moldova and Romania were under its control.

The Orthodox monastery of Manyava was founded and developed in period between 1606 - 1785. The founding father of the monastery is Saint Job of Maniava, who was monk on the Greek Athos for some time before. In 1606, together with Ivan Vyshensky and religious writer Zakhariya Kopystensky of Kyiv Pechersk lavra he organized the first monk community here.

In 1618 there were 40 monks residing in the skete. In 1621 the monastery was granted stauropegic status and that meant its direct subordination to the Patriarch of Constantinople.

Right after its renovation in 1781, it was unexpectedly closed down by Austrian authorities on 1 July 1785. The monastery in Maniava was reestablished with the collapse of communism in Ukraine in the early 1990s, nearly 200 years later.

The clairvoyant hegumen Ioann / John (in the world: Vasyl Hrynyuk), known for his kind-heartedness, was the first head of Manyava Skete after it was reopened. Many Orthodox faithful from Ukraine, Russia and Poland sought his help. Having foreseen his death, he died in 2003 and is buried on the territory of the monastery and his grave is much venerated by the Orthodox pilgrims. Already after his death, he appeared in a dream to one of the monks waking him up with words "Stand up, you are burning" when the electrical wiring was on fire in the monastery. This happened to be true and saved the Skete from the fire.

Marian apparitions 

In 1652 there was the plague epidemic in skete and the neighbouring areas. Many monks were dying from it. The remaining monks were pleading to God for mercy. On December 22, 1652, the Manyava hieromonk Filaret had a dream vision of Blessed Theotokos being dressed in a red hegumen's cloak, who came in through the monastery gates and entered the Church of Annunciation of Virgin Mary and having stopped there, said. "The plague will already stop". In remembrance of this event there is an icon "Hegumenia of the Manyava monastery" kept in the skete.

Churches in the skete

In Manyva Skete there are three churches. The main one of the Exaltation of the Holy Cross, the second church is of the holy martyrs Borys and Hlib and besides these there is also underground church dedicated to Archangel Michael.

Prominent visitors

The second president of Ukraine - Leonid Kuchma visited the place and supported the restoration of the monastery. Other presidents of Ukraine - Viktor Yushchenko, of Georgia - Mikhail Saakashvili and of Russia - Boris Yeltsin all visited the Manyava Skete.

Patriarch Filaret and many of the hierarchs of the Ukrainian Orthodox Church of Kyiv patriarchate visit Maniava Skete on regular basis.

Blessed Stone and sacred spring

Manyava Skete is also famous for its "Blessed Stone", regarded as a place of prayer and of the spiritual purification. The stone reminds a giant cave with the space of 10 x 3 meters, a typical dwelling of the solitary monks, a skete. This was a first place, where the founding monks (the first apostles of the subcarpathian highland) settled in the 13th century.

The spring of healing water emits from underneath the Blessed Stone. It is being said that the water has the same healing properties as the waters of Lourdes. The spring ceased when the monastery was closed and miraculously started flowing again with the reopening of Maniava Skete.

Founding fathers of Manyava Skete

 Saint Job of Manyava
 Saint Theodosius of Manyava
 Ivan Vyshenskyi

References

External links
 Manyava Skete - Official homepage
 Manyava Skete, official site of Ivano-Frankivsk bishopric of the Ukrainian Orthodox Church of Kyiv Patriarchate
 Manjava Skete: Ukrainian Monastic Writings of the Seventeenth Century (Cistercian Studies Number 192) (paperback)
 Sacred places of the monastery (Ukrainian)

Monasteries of the Orthodox Church of Ukraine
Sketes in Ukraine
Churches of the Orthodox Church of Ukraine
Marian apparitions
Shrines to the Virgin Mary
Convents in Ukraine
Sacred springs
History of Christianity in Ukraine